The 1972 NC State Wolfpack football team represented North Carolina State University during the 1972 NCAA University Division football season. The Wolfpack were led by first-year head coach Lou Holtz and played their home games at Carter Stadium in Raleigh, North Carolina. They competed as members of the Atlantic Coast Conference, finishing in second. NC State was invited to the 1972 Peach Bowl in Atlanta, where they defeated West Virginia.

Schedule

References

NC State
NC State Wolfpack football seasons
Peach Bowl champion seasons
NC State Wolfpack football